Smalltown Poets is the debut album of the Christian rock band of the same name. It was released in 1997 by ForeFront Records and was produced by Jon Hampton.

The album sold over 200,000 copies and had six Top 20 singles, among them two number-one singles.

Track listing

"Inside the Bubble" ends at 4:05 and then, starting at 4:38, there is a studio outtake of "Trust".

Track information and credits adapted from Discogs and AllMusic, then verified from the album's liner notes.

Awards
 Nominated for a Best Rock Gospel Album Grammy
 Won a Best Rock Album Dove Award

Personnel
Michael Johnston - vocals, guitars
Danny Stephens - keyboards
Byron Goggin - drums
Kevin Breuner - guitars
Miguel DeJesús - bass guitar

References

External links
Smalltown Poets in Geneva

Smalltown Poets albums
1997 albums